Phlyctaenogastra is a genus of moths in the family Erebidae erected by Max Gaede in 1915.

Species
The genus consists of three species: 
Phlyctaenogastra rangei Gaede, 1915
Phlyctaenogastra britae Kühne, 2010
Phlyctaenogastra familia Kühne, 2010

References

 , 1915: Lepidoptera von Herrn P. Range im Nama-Land, Deutsch S. W. Afrika, gesammelt. Deutsche Entomologische Zeitschrift, Iris 29: 144–148.
 , 2010: Taxonomische Ergebnisse der Bearbeitung der Nachfalterfauna des südlichen Afrikas (Lepidoptera: Noctuoidea). Esperiana Memoir 5: 433–456.

Spilosomina
Moth genera
Taxa named by Max Gaede